Invasion of the Booty Snatchers is the second studio album by the P-Funk spin off group Parlet. Released on May 15, 1979, this was the final Parlet album to feature Mallia Franklin and the first to feature Janice Evans. The album was produced by George Clinton and Ron Dunbar. The cover art was created by Ronald "Stozo" Edwards. The album's highest-charting single was "Riding High".

Invasion of the Booty Snatchers was re-released in Japan on the Casablanca/Polystar label in 1992 and in Germany on Universal in 2003. On July 30, 2013, Real Gone Music in the U.S. reissued both Pleasure Principle and Invasion of the Booty Snatchers, featuring liner notes by former P-Funk minister of information Tom Vickers.

Track listing
 "Riding High" (Ron Dunbar, Donny Sterling) – released as 7-inch single Casablanca NB 975 and 12-inch single Casablanca NBD 20161 DJ 7:40
 "No Rump to Bump" (Donny Sterling, Ron Dunbar, Jim Vitti, George Clinton) 6:10
 "Don't Ever Stop (Lovin' Me, Needin' Me)" (Glenn Goins, Ron Dunbar, George Clinton) – released as single Casablanca NB 995 7:13
 "Booty Snatchers" (Ron Dunbar, George Clinton, Phillipina Bishop) 5:50
 "You're Leaving" (Gary Cooper, George Clinton, Ron Dunbar) 6:26
 "Huff-N-Puff" (Ron Dunbar, Michael Hampton) 7:17

Personnel
 Guitars: Gordon Carlton, Jerome Ali, Phelps Collins, Bootsy Collins, Michael Hampton, Kevin D. Oliver, Tim Moore, Glenn Goins, Garry Shider
 Bass: Bootsy Collins, Donnie R. Sterling, Jeff Bunn, Jimmy Ali
 Drums: Frank Waddy, Gary Cooper, Bootsy Collins, Kenny Colton
 Percussion: Carl Small, Larry Fratangelo
 Keyboards/Synthesizers: Bernie Worrell, Ernestro Wilson, Joel Johnson, Manon Saulsby
 Horns: Benny Cowan, Greg Boyer, Greg Thomas
 Additional vocals: George Clinton, Mallia Franklin, Donnie Sterling, Cheryl James, Ray Davis, Ron Ford, Robert Johnson, Gary Cooper, Gordon Carlton, Janice Carlton

References

1979 albums
Parlet albums
Casablanca Records albums